The University of Perpetual Help System Dalta - Calamba Campus (UPHSD Calamba)  or simply Perpetual, was founded on 1996 in Barangay Paciano Rizal, Calamba. It is a private, non-sectarian educational institution run by the Dalta Group of Companies.

The 3rd UPHD  branch, the UPHD Calamba campus was established in 1996 with 360 students. To date, its enrollment has increased to 3,000 enrollees.

Academic Program Offerings
Engineering and Architecture
BS Electronics and Communications Engineering
BS Computer Engineering
BS Civil Engineering
BS Electrical Engineering
BS Mechanical Engineering
BS Industrial Engineering
BS Architecture

Allied Health Sciences
BS Nursing
BS Medical Technology
BS Pharmacy
BS Physical Therapy
BS Occupational Therapy
BS Radiologic Technology

Business
BS Accountancy
BS Business Administration - Marketing Management
BS Business Administration - Human Resources Development Management
BS Accounting Technology
BS Entrepreneurship
BS Agribusiness

Computer Studies
BS Computer Science
BS Information Technology
Associate in Computer Technology

Arts and Sciences
AB Mass Communication
AB Psychology

Criminology
BS Criminology

Education
BS Elementary Education
BS Secondary Education

International Hospitality Management
BS Hotel and Restaurant Management
BS Tourism
Associate in Hotel and Restaurant Management

TESDA/VocTech
Caregiving NC II
Agricultural Crops Production
Animal Production
Food and Beverages Services NC II
Housekeeping NC II
Commercial Cooking NC II
Computer Hardware Services
Medical Transcription

Short Term Courses
Culinary Arts
Massage Therapy
Baking and Pastry Arts
AUTOCAD
Computer Technician
Graphics Design
Computer Fundamentals
Welding
Foreign Languages (Korean, Nippongo, French)
English Proficiency
Conversational English

Basic Education
Kinder 1 
Kinder 2
Grade 1-6
Grade 7-8
Third and Fourth Year High School

See also
 Society of Industrial Engineering

External links
The OFFICIAL Website of UPHSD
University of Perpetual Help DALTA Medical Center
Student Life - UPHSD

Universities and colleges in Laguna (province)
University of Perpetual Help System
Education in Calamba, Laguna